Eurytheca is a genus of fungi in the family Myriangiaceae.

References

Myriangiales
Dothideomycetes genera
Taxa described in 1878